U S Rail Corporation (reporting mark USRC) is a family-owned short-line railroad operating the Winamac Southern Railway in Indiana.

Operation

Kokomo
The Kokomo division, in Kokomo, Indiana, operates a line for the Kokomo Grain Company and Winamac Southern Railway, transporting grain and serving the communities of Amboy, Marion, Converse, Sweetser, Galveston, Walton, Logansport, Clymers, Camden, Flora and Bringhurst.  It interchanges with Norfolk Southern in Marion and Clymers, Indiana, Toledo, Peoria & Western in Logansport, and Central Railroad of Indianapolis in Kokomo, Indiana.

US Rail went bankrupt after the death of Gabe Hall.  The Genessee and Wyoming RR line Toledo Peoria and Western absorbed USR operations and now runs 2 crews 6 days a week out of Kokomo Indiana.

References

External links
US Rail website

Indiana railroads
Transportation in Howard County, Indiana
Transportation in Tipton County, Indiana
Standard gauge railways in the United States